Niedersayn is an Ortsgemeinde – a community belonging to a Verbandsgemeinde – in the Westerwaldkreis in Rhineland-Palatinate, Germany.

Geography

Location
The community lies north of Montabaur on the river Sayn. Since 1971 it has belonged to what was then the newly founded Verbandsgemeinde of Wirges, a kind of collective municipality. Its seat is in the like-named town.

Constituent communities
Niedersayn's Ortsteile are Karnhöfen, Blaumhöfen and Niedersayn.

History
In 1277, Niedersayn had its first documentary mention under the name Langesain.

Politics

The municipal council is made up of 7 council members, including the extraofficial mayor (Bürgermeister), who were elected in a majority vote in a municipal election on 13 June 2004.

Economy and infrastructure

East of the community runs Bundesstraße 255, linking Montabaur and Rennerod, and also Bundesstraße 8. The nearest Autobahn interchange is Montabaur on the A 3 (Cologne–Frankfurt), some 3 km away. The nearest InterCityExpress stop is the railway station at Montabaur on the Cologne-Frankfurt high-speed rail line.

References

External links
Niedersayn 

Municipalities in Rhineland-Palatinate
Westerwaldkreis